AU Small Finance Bank Limited is an Indian Small finance bank, based in Jaipur, India. It was founded as vehicle finance company AU Financiers (India) Ltd in 1996 and converted to a small finance bank on 19 April 2017. AU Small Finance Bank serves low and middle income individuals and micro and small businesses that have limited or no access to formal banking and finance channels. The Bank offers loans, deposits and payment products and services.

AU Bank enjoys long term credit rating of “AA-/Stable” from CRISIL Ratings, ICRA Ratings, India Ratings and CARE Ratings.

History
The company was founded by Sanjay Agarwal (managing director and CEO of AU Small Finance Bank) as a private limited company, and publicly listed in an IPO on 29 June 2017. A merit holder Chartered Accountant and a first generation entrepreneur, he holds ~28.5% stake in the Bank. He is supported by a team of 23,486 employees.

AU Small Finance Bank is listed on NSE & BSE with market capitalization of ~Rs. 37,942 crore. On its first day of trading, the stock rose 51% to be the most expensive bank in India based on price-to-book.

In November 2017, the Reserve Bank of India added the bank to its schedule of commercial banks, further improving the bank's growth prospects by reducing the cost of short-term funds and improving the bank's ability to provide services.

Shareholding

Institutional holding 
Over the years, the Bank has attracted marquee investors like IFC, Warburg Pincus, Temasek Holdings, Nomura, Kotak Mahindra MF, etc. Private equity companies that provided venture capital, including Warburg Pincus and International Finance Corporation, made partial exits for as much as nine times their original investment.

Bharti SBM 
May 2020 - Bharti (SBM) Holdings Pvt. Ltd, a firm owned by Sunil Mittal family has acquired 0.79% for a consideration of INR100 crores.

Services
Due to its history as a vehicle finance company, as of March 2018 almost all the loans made by AU Small Finance Bank were secured, unlike most small finance banks that have unsecured loans due to their background in microfinance. This provides lower yields (lower interest rates) than unsecured loans, so the bank has been particularly active in growing its deposits, as bank deposits have lower cost than other sources of funds. It has also sought to diversify into savings products like deposits, payment / transaction banking, distribution of third-party products, and additional loan products thereby positioning itself as a holistic financial products and services provider.

Footprint
As on June 30, 2021, AU Small Finance Bank's distribution network comprises 758 Banking Touchpoints, 23,486 employees spread contiguously across 15 states and two Union Territories with over 2 million customers.

The bank has operations in 15 states and two union territory, with Rajasthan, Gujarat, Maharashtra and Madhya Pradesh being key states. It is one of the largest banks by number of locations in its home state of Rajasthan.

See also

 Banking in India
 List of banks in India
 Indian Financial System Code
 List of companies of India

References

Small finance banks
Indian companies established in 1996
Banks established in 1996
Private sector banks in India
Warburg Pincus companies
1996 establishments in Rajasthan
Companies based in Rajasthan
Companies listed on the National Stock Exchange of India
Companies listed on the Bombay Stock Exchange